Kim Jung-ya (김정야 | born May 17, 1988) is a Zainichi Korean football player who plays for Fujieda MYFC. He holds South Korean nationality but is exempt from J. League squad restrictions on foreign players.

Club statistics
Last update: 18 February 2019.

1 includes J. League Championship appearances and 2 = Japanese Super Cup and Suruga Bank Championship appearances.

Reserves performance

Honors

Gamba Osaka
J1 League - 2014
Emperor's Cup - 2014, 2015
J. League Cup - 2014
Japanese Super Cup - 2015

References

External links
Profile at Vegalta Sendai

1988 births
Living people
Komazawa University alumni
Association football people from Hyōgo Prefecture
South Korean footballers
J1 League players
J3 League players
Gamba Osaka players
Gamba Osaka U-23 players
Sagan Tosu players
Vegalta Sendai players
South Korean expatriate footballers
Expatriate footballers in Japan
South Korean expatriate sportspeople in Japan
Association football defenders
Zainichi Korean people